Baker Memorial Methodist Episcopal Church, now known as Baker Memorial United Methodist Church, is a historic Methodist Episcopal church complex located at East Aurora in Erie County, New York. It was built in 1927, and is limestone structure with cat stone trim.  It consists of the church, a one-story chapel, and attached parish hall in the Collegiate Gothic style. The church features a three-story entrance tower and opalescent glass windows produced by Louis Comfort Tiffany.  Also on the property are a contributing rectory, garage, and frame caretaker's house.

It was listed on the National Register of Historic Places in 2012.

References

External links
Baker Memorial United Methodist Church website

EastAurora BakerMemorial
EastAurora BakerMemorial
EastAurora BakerMemorial
EastAurora BakerMemorial
EastAurora BakerMemorial
EastAurora BakerMemorial
National Register of Historic Places in Erie County, New York